Cladonia strepsilis or the olive cup lichen is a species of cup lichen in the family Cladoniaceae. In Iceland, where it is only found in a few locations in the Eastern Region, it is red listed as endangered (EN).

References

strepsilis
Taxa named by Erik Acharius